Carabus monilifer is a species of ground beetle in the family Carabidae. It is found in China, North and South Korea, and Russia.

Subspecies
These 23 subspecies belong to the species Carabus monilifer:
 Carabus monilifer branickii Taczanowski, 1888  (China, North Korea, and South Korea)
 Carabus monilifer cyanelytron Deuve & Li in Deuve, 2003  (China)
 Carabus monilifer dachangensis Li & A.Mülller, 2009  (China)
 Carabus monilifer dolichognathus Deuve, 1995  (North Korea)
 Carabus monilifer euviridis (Ishikawa & Kim, 1983)  (South Korea)
 Carabus monilifer furumiellus Deuve, 1994  (China)
 Carabus monilifer hoenggandoensis (Kwon & Lee, 1984)  (South Korea)
 Carabus monilifer honanensis (G.Hauser, 1921)  (China)
 Carabus monilifer hongdoensis (Kwon & Lee, 1984)  (South Korea)
 Carabus monilifer lengxuemeiae Deuve & Li in Deuve, 2001  (China)
 Carabus monilifer liaodongensis (Li, 1992)  (China)
 Carabus monilifer longipennis (Chaudoir, 1863)  (China and Russia) (formerly Carabus smaragdinus)
 Carabus monilifer losevi Rapuzzi, 2016  (Russia)
 Carabus monilifer mandshuricus Semenov, 1898  (China, North Korea, and Russia)
 Carabus monilifer monilifer Tatum, 1847  (South Korea)
 Carabus monilifer neomaoershanicus Li; A.Müller & Zhang, 2008  (China)
 Carabus monilifer pinganensis (G.Hauser, 1920)  (North Korea)
 Carabus monilifer shantungensis (Born, 1910)  (China)
 Carabus monilifer sungkii J.K. & J.Park, 2013  (South Korea)
 Carabus monilifer tangweiae Deuve & Li, 2001  (China)
 Carabus monilifer yanggangensis Deuve & Li in Deuve, 2000  (North Korea)
 Carabus monilifer yichunensis Deuve & Li, 1999  (North Korea)
 Carabus monilifer zhongtiaoshanus Imura & Yamaya, 1994  (China)

References

monilifer